Mike Hart is an American poker player from Winter Haven, Florida.

Hart is a veteran of many years at the World Series of Poker and has won four WSOP championship bracelets, with two bracelets in Razz, one in limit Texas hold 'em and one in seven-card stud eight or better. He has cashed in various other events at the WSOP.

In the 1986 WSOP Main Event, he finished runner-up to Berry Johnston and won $228,000.

As of 2017, Hart's total live tournament winnings exceeded $1,600,000. His 18 cashes at the WSOP account for $820,568 of those winnings.

World Series of Poker bracelets

References 

American poker players
World Series of Poker bracelet winners
Year of birth missing (living people)
Living people
People from Escondido, California